Universe Cineplex (also known as Universal Cineplex) is a movie theater and cinema chain in Karachi, Pakistan. It was launched in September 2003 at Seaview. It operates five multiplex type cinemas. Cinema is only allowed to families.

Criticism 
In 2010 Universe Cineplex showed pirated prints of Milenge Milenge and Knight and Day in the cinema. Cinema of Karachi took action on the cinema.

References

External links 
 
 

Cinemas and movie theatres in Pakistan
Cinema chains in Pakistan
2003 establishments in Pakistan